Steven Gwon Sheng Louie (26 March 1949, Taishan, Guangdong, China) is a computational condensed-matter physicist. He is a professor of physics at the University of California, Berkeley and senior faculty scientist in the Materials Sciences Division at Lawrence Berkeley National Laboratory, where his research focuses on nanoscience. He is also scientific director of the Theory of Nanostructured Materials Facility at the Molecular Foundry.

He was born in Taishan, Guangdong province, China in 1949 and moved to San Francisco when he was 10. His Chinese name is 雷干城 (pinyin: Léi Gānchéng). He received his PhD degree in 1976 from Berkeley, working with Professor Marvin L. Cohen.

Honors 
 1986 Fellow of the American Physical Society
 1996 Aneesur Rahman Prize for Computational Physics (American Physical Society)
 1999 Davisson-Germer Prize in Surface Physics (American Physical Society)
 2003 Richard P. Feynman Prize in Molecular Nanotechnology (Foresight Institute)
 2005 Elected to National Academy of Sciences
 2009 Elected to American Academy of Arts and Sciences
 2015 Materials Theory Award (Materials Research Society)

References

External links 
 Research group website
 Google profile

1949 births
Living people
People from Taishan, Guangdong
People from San Francisco
People's Republic of China emigrants to the United States
21st-century American physicists
University of California, Berkeley alumni
University of California, Berkeley College of Letters and Science faculty
Members of the United States National Academy of Sciences
Computational physicists
Fellows of the American Physical Society
Foreign members of the Chinese Academy of Sciences